Ingvild Aleksandersen (born 1968) is a Norwegian lawyer who was serving as County Governor of Finnmark county from 2016 to 2018.

Personal life
Aleksandersen was born in 1968, in Vadsø, the administrative centre of Finnmark, the country's northernmost county.

Education and career
Aleksandersen graduated from the University of Oslo in 1995 with a cand.jur. degree.  She then worked as a lawyer in private practice, for the Finnmark Estate, and for the Finnmark County Municipality.  From 2013-2016, she was the assistant county governor of Finnmark under Gov. Gunnar Kjønnøy.  On 1 October 2016, she was appointed as County Governor of Finnmark county.  This job was temporary because the Government of Norway was re-evaluating the counties in Norway and the future of Finnmark as a separate county after 2019 was uncertain. Aleksandersen held the post until 2018, after which the Governor positions of Troms and Finnmark were merged from 2019.

References

1968 births
Living people
County governors of Norway
People from Vadsø
University of Oslo alumni
Norwegian women lawyers
20th-century Norwegian lawyers
21st-century Norwegian lawyers
20th-century women lawyers
21st-century women lawyers
20th-century Norwegian women